Jasmine Sky Blackborow (born 28 August 1991) is an English actress and voiceover artist who began her career in theatre. She played Marie in the first season of the Netflix series Shadow and Bone and Jessica in the film Demon Mind. She is in main cast of Canal+ and BBC drama series Marie Antoinette.

Early life 
Blackborow was born in Hackney, East London and grew up in North London. She attended Enfield County School for Girls and then The Latymer School in Edmonton. She graduated with a Bachelor of Arts in English Literature from the University of East Anglia and later a Master of Arts in Classical Acting from the Royal Central School of Speech and Drama.

Career 
Blackborow made her debut as the doomed Lucy in Bram Stoker's Dracula as adapted by Theresa Heskins for the New Vic Theatre in 2015. She then played Rosie in Rose Lewenstein's play Now This is Not the End at the Arcola Theatre. Her next role saw her play Maid Marion in Hood directed by Jack McNamara. In 2016, she played the younger Maya in Grey Man directed by Robin Winfield-Smith. Blackborow then played Frances in Rodney Ackland's After October. Blackborow took on the roles Ursala in Much Ado About Nothing and Desdemona in Othello at the Pop-Up Globe in 2017. She returned to London in 2018 to play Fanny Fairlove / Louisa in J.P. Wooler's rediscovered classics A Winning Hazard.

Blackborow played Kaitlyn in Aamir, a true short film about a boy in an unofficial refugee camp, which was nominated for a Best British Short Film at the BAFTAs. She played Georgie in a short comedy film, Dad Joke by David Abramsky, released in 2019. She next appeared as Heather in Tosca Musk's The Protector. Blackborow was cast as school matron Jane Crowther in School's Out Forever

Blackborow made her television debut as Marie, an Inferni in the first season of the Netflix adaptation of Shadow and Bone. She appeared in the film Daemon Mind.

She toured Australia with the “pop up Globe” performing Shakespeare.

Filmography

Film

Television

Stage

Audio

Notes

References

External links

Living people
1991 births
21st-century English actresses
Actresses from London
Alumni of the Royal Central School of Speech and Drama
Alumni of the University of East Anglia
English voice actresses
People educated at The Latymer School
People from Hackney, London